In cryptography, ABC is a stream cypher algorithm developed by Vladimir Anashin, Andrey Bogdanov, Ilya Kizhvatov, and Sandeep Kumar. It has been submitted to the eSTREAM Project of the eCRYPT network.

References

Stream ciphers